Rakeshprasad (Devnagari: राकेशप्रसाद्जी; born 23 July 1966) is a Hindu spiritual leader. He is regarded by the devpaksh faction as the disputed leader of the LaxmiNarayan Dev Gadi. Rakeshprasadji has interests in Sanskrit and Prakrit literature on religion, and that he has established temples and consecrated idols in them.  

An order by the Gujarat High Court restrained Ajendraprasadji Maharaj from acting as Acharya. This was a temporary order until the concluding court case. Ajendraprasad disputed this and filed a review petition in the Gujarat High Court.  A satsang mahasabha headed by monks namely, Nautam Swami, self-appointed Rakeshprasad as their leader. Ajendraprasad's main ideology was that monks of the fellowship should stay in their prescribed rules and regulations. Especially after some monks had turned towards murdering fellow monks. Ajendraprasad at the time was firm and strong furied many monks to dispose of him.

Many of the sects followers, particularly in the siddhant paksh and outside of India, regard Ajendraprasad as acharya of the LaxmiNarayan Dev Gadi. Ajendraprasad is present in Vadtals Raghuveer Vadi; however, the courts are still unclear as to the genuine acharya.

Swaminarayan Vadtal Gadi

The Vadtal gadi is known as LaxmiNarayan Dev Gadi or Dakshin Desh Gadi. The gadi was established by Swaminarayan and he appointed Raghuvirji Maharaj as the first head of the LaxmiNarayan Dev Gadi. Swaminarayan ordered his devotees whether monks or householders to obey their Acharya.

Controversies
Sadhus under him have been charged of multiple crimes such as theft, corruption, and rape.

See also
 Koshalendraprasad Pande of NarNarayan Dev Gadi

References

External links
 Shree LaxmiNarayan Dev Gadi Website

Swaminarayan Sampradaya
Indian Hindu spiritual teachers
1966 births
Living people
21st-century Hindu religious leaders